Tony Lee (born May 29, 1986) is an American former basketball player. He was a standout college player for the Robert Morris Colonials and played professionally in several countries.

Hailing from Boston, Lee played at Charlestown High School. He was lightly recruited due his size, but ultimately was signed by coach Mark Schmidt at Robert Morris over offers from Maryland Eastern Shore and Merrimack. He made his mark at the school, finishing his career in the school's top ten in points, rebounds and assists. 

In the 2007–08 season, Lee led the Colonials to a Northeast Conference (NEC) regular season championship. He averaged 13.6 points, 6.6 rebounds and 6.4 assists per game and recorded triple-doubles in consecutive games. At the close of the season he was named the Northeast Conference Player of the Year and first-team all-NEC.

Following his college career, Lee played professionally in Poland and Austria. He was first tested in Slovenia and then played the 2008–09 season in Poland with Sportino Inowrocław. For the 2009–10 season, he joined BK Ventspils in Latvia but left the team before making his debut. For the 2010–11 season, he joined Flyers Wels in Austria but left after playing 11 games. His final game came on November 27, 2010.

References

External links
Robert Morris Colonials bio
College stats @ sports-reference.com

1986 births
Living people
American expatriate basketball people in Austria
American expatriate basketball people in Poland
American men's basketball players
Basketball players from Boston
Flyers Wels players
Point guards
Robert Morris Colonials men's basketball players
People from Charlestown, Boston